Herbert was a Legislative Assembly electorate in the state (colony until 1901) of Queensland.

History
Herbert was created in 1888. It was located in north-east Queensland, initially from Cairns to Townsville. It was abolished in the 1949 redistribution (taking effect at the 1950 elections), being incorporated into the newly created Electoral district of Mourilyan.

Members

The following people were elected in the seat of Herbert:

See also
 Electoral districts of Queensland
 Members of the Queensland Legislative Assembly by year
 :Category:Members of the Queensland Legislative Assembly by name
 Division of Herbert for the federal House of Representatives electorate of the same name

References

Former electoral districts of Queensland
1888 establishments in Australia
1950 disestablishments in Australia
Constituencies established in 1888
Constituencies disestablished in 1950